Ilex taubertiana is a species in the genus Ilex of the family Aquifoliaceae. It is native to Brazil, typically in Atlantic Forest, where it is found in montane rain forests and cloud forests.

It is occasionally used to adulterate maté.

References

taubertiana
Endemic flora of Brazil
Flora of the Atlantic Forest